Mamasa River is a river in Sulawesi, Indonesia. It is a tributary of the Sadang River.

Geography
The river flows in the southeast area of Sulawesi with predominantly tropical monsoon climate (designated as Am in the Köppen-Geiger climate classification). The annual average temperature in the area is 23 °C. The warmest month is October, when the average temperature is around 26 °C, and the coldest is June, at 24 °C. The average annual rainfall is 2500 mm. The wettest month is May, with an average of 387 mm rainfall, and the driest is September, with 68 mm rainfall.

See also
List of rivers of Indonesia
List of rivers of Sulawesi

References

Rivers of South Sulawesi
Rivers of Indonesia